Glehnia is a genus of plants in the carrot family, Apiaceae. It is monotypic, being represented by the single species, Glehnia littoralis, commonly known as beach silvertop and American silvertop. The genus was named after Russian botanist Peter von Glehn.

Description
It is a long-taprooted plant forming a basal patch of leaves, with each leaf made up of several rounded, lobular segments. It reaches a maximum height exceeding , with the North American subspecies only reported to reach . The plant's erect stem is topped with an umbel of carrotlike white flowers.

Chemistry

The plant contains naphthisoxazole A.

Taxonomy
Two subspecies exist, one in Asia and one in North America; the latter is named leiocarpa.

Distribution and habitat
It is native to eastern Asia, particularly eastern China, Japan, and far-eastern Russia, and western North America from Alaska to northern California. It can be found on sandy beaches and dunes.

Uses
The plant is perhaps best known as a Chinese herbal remedy for cough.

References

External links

USDA Plants Profile
Flora of China
Photo gallery

Apioideae
Flora of Alaska
Flora of California
Flora of China
Flora of Japan
Flora of the Russian Far East
Flora of the West Coast of the United States
Flora of Western Canada
Medicinal plants of Asia
Medicinal plants of North America
Plants used in traditional Chinese medicine
Monotypic Apioideae genera